Annunciation Church or Blagovestenska Church in Szentendre is a Serbian Orthodox church in Hungary. Local church parish is under the jurisdiction of Eparchy of Buda.

See also
Serbs in Hungary

References

Szentendre
Serb communities in Hungary
Buildings and structures in Pest County
Tourist attractions in Pest County
Serbian Orthodox church buildings in Hungary